The Dulan Site is an archaeological site in Dulan Village, Donghe Township, Taitung County, Taiwan.

History
During the Japanese rule of Taiwan, a rectangular stony coffin was excavated in the area. Following the investigation by Academia Sinica, it led to the discovery of a giant stone piles. The site and objects date back to 3,000 years ago. It is now considered a cultural heritage and third grade historical site.

Features
The area is divided into two areas, which are stony coffin area and stony wall area. Footpaths and explanatory signs are available within the vicinity.

See also

 Prehistory of Taiwan

References

Archaeological sites in Taiwan
Buildings and structures in Taitung County